Xiuninggpus is an extinct ichnogenus of dinosaur footprint. There are two known ichnospecies, X. xintanensis and X. qukouensis.

References

External links
 
 

Dinosaur trace fossils